Noi siamo le colonne (i.e. "We are the columns") is a 1956 Italian comedy-drama film written and directed by Luigi Filippo D'Amico and starring Vittorio De Sica, Franco Fabrizi and Antonio Cifariello.

Plot

Cast 

Vittorio De Sica as Alfredo Celimontani
Franco Fabrizi as Aldo Perego
Antonio Cifariello as Ugo Stefani
Mireille Granelli as Lea
 Vanna Vivaldi as  Elettra
Aroldo Tieri as Archimede
Lauro Gazzolo as Mr. Bonci
Zoe Incrocci as   Archimede's Sister
 Ottavio Alessi as  Bartolozzi
Elisa Montés as  Sofia
Pina Gallini as  Giulia
Laura Betti as The Singer
Franco Migliacci 
Liana Del Balzo 
Nando Tamberlani

References

External links

Italian comedy-drama films
1956 comedy-drama films
Films directed by Luigi Filippo D'Amico
Films scored by Mario Nascimbene
1956 comedy films
1956 drama films
1956 films
Italian black-and-white films
1950s Italian films